Brokenleg Lake is a lake in Alberta, Canada.

Brokenleg Lake's name is an accurate preservation of its native name.

See also
List of lakes of Alberta

References

Lakes of Alberta